Saint Andrew East Central is a parliamentary constituency represented in the House of Representatives of the Jamaican Parliament. It elects one Member of Parliament MP by the first past the post system of election. The current MP is Peter Phillips.

Boundaries 

Constituency includes Cassia Park.

References

Parliamentary constituencies of Jamaica